The dark deepwater snake eel (Ophichthus aphotistos) is an eel in the family Ophichthidae. It was described by John E. McCosker and Chen Yu-Yun in 2000. It is a marine, deep water-dwelling eel which is known from Taiwan, in the northwestern Pacific Ocean. It dwells at a depth range of 36–1350 m (most commonly 250–350 m), and inhabits sand and mud. Specimens have been observed in burrows with only their heads exposed, or resting on sediment with their bodies curved in an S shape. Females can reach a maximum total length of 62.8 cm.

The specific epithet aphotistos, meaning dark or obscure, refers both to the eel's appearance and its habitat.

References

Taxa named by John E. McCosker
Taxa named by Chen Yu-Yun
Fish described in 2000
Ophichthus